Cirsium horridulum, called bristly thistle, horrid thistle,  yellow thistle or bull thistle, is a North American species of plants in the tribe Cardueae within the family Asteraceae. It is an annual or biennial.  The species is native to the eastern and southern United States from New England to Florida, Texas, and Oklahoma as well as to Mexico, Belize, Guatemala, Honduras, and the Bahamas.

Thomas Nuttall (1786-1859) described var. megacanthum as "one of the most terribly armed plants in the genus."

There are usually several flower heads, also with sharp spines, Luma apiculata each head with disc florets but no ray florets. Flower color varies from one plant to the next: white, yellow, pink, red or purple.

Varieties
 Cirsium horridulum var. horridulum - from Maine to Guatemala
 Cirsium horridulum var. megacanthum (Nutt.) D.J.Keil - from the Florida Panhandle to Texas and Oklahoma
 Cirsium horridulum var. vittatum (Small) R.W.Long - from North Carolina to Louisiana

Conservation status in the United States
It is endangered in Connecticut, New Hampshire, and Pennsylvania. It is listed as threatened in Rhode Island.

As a noxious weed
The Cirsium genus is listed as a noxious weed in Arkansas and Iowa.

Native American ethnobotany
The Houma people make an infusion of the leaves and root of the plant in whiskey. They use it as both as an astringent, and drink it to clear phlegm from lungs and throat. They also eat the tender, white hearts of the plant raw. The Seminole use the spines of the plant as darts for their blowguns.

Ecology
It is a larval host to the little metalmark and the painted lady butterflies. Its flowers are popular for their nectar and pollen with butterflies and bumble bees.

References

External links

horridulum
Flora of North America
Flora of Central America
Plants described in 1803
Plants used in Native American cuisine
Plants used in traditional Native American medicine